is an uninhabited island in the Meldorf Bay, about  off the North Sea coast of Dithmarschen in north Germany – about  from the Trischendamm embankment. The island belongs to the municipality of Friedrichskoog and is only occupied from March to October by a bird warden from the Nature and Biodiversity Conservation Union or NABU. Otherwise it is out-of-bounds. Trischen originated about 400 years ago and moves about 3 m per month towards Büsum on the mainland. 

Trischen is visited by birds as a breeding and resting area. Up to 100,000 birds of some species, such as the shelduck, knot or dunlin, occur on the island and in the nearby Wadden Sea. Since 1985 it has been part of the core zone of the Schleswig-Holstein Wadden Sea National Park.

References 

 Landesamt für den Nationalpark Schleswig-Holsteinisches Wattenmeer (Hrsg.): Trischen – Perle im Nationalpark. Boyens, Heide 2000, .
 Landesvermessungsamt Schleswig-Holstein, C. Degn und U. Muuß: Topographischer Atlas Schleswig-Holstein, Neumünster 1963, S.140f, Trischen - Werden und Vergehen einer Insel.
 Hans Leip: Die Insel Trischen. Hamburg 1989 (herausgegeben von der Hans-Leip-Gesellschaft enthält das Buch Tagebuchaufzeichnungen und Farbbilder aus der Zeit der Künstlerkolonie).
 Steffen Oppel: Natural Dynamics Shaping the Bird Community on an Island. Lessons for Large-scale Management from Trischen Island in "Wadden Sea Newsletter No. 30; 2004 -1" als pdf
 Herbert Rittlinger: Amphibische Reise zu verlorenen Inseln. F. A. Brockhaus, 1958.

External links 

 Website of the island of Trischen 
 Tidal calendar 
 Portrait of Peter Todt bei mare 
 Trischen in der Nordsee: Die schnellste Insel der Welt 

Frisian Islands
Dithmarschen
Uninhabited islands of Germany